Hurricane Carlotta was the most powerful hurricane of the 2000 Pacific hurricane season.

The hurricane produced heavy rainfall and rough surf along the southwest coast of Mexico, though no serious damage was reported. A Lithuanian freighter traversing through the peak of the hurricane was lost after experiencing an engine failure; its crew of 18 was presumed killed.

Meteorological history

A tropical wave moved off the coast of Africa on June 3. It tracked westward across the unfavorable Atlantic Ocean, and on June 15 it crossed Central America into the eastern Pacific Ocean. At around 1200 UTC on June 17, Dvorak classifications began on the disturbance, though initially its convection was broadly distributed and disorganized. The next day, however, an area of concentrated convection developed just south of the Gulf of Tehuantepec. Ships in the vicinity confirmed the development of a surface circulation within the system, while satellite imagery showed the development of a central dense overcast.

Initially, the convection of the depression was displaced to the west of the circulation due to some easterly wind shear, though as it tracked west-northwestward parallel to the coast of Mexico, it maintained and developed deep convection near and over the center. With favorable conditions, the cyclone strengthened and became Tropical Storm Carlotta early on June 19. Late that day, a ragged banding-eye feature developed on satellite imagery, while at the same time it maintained an area of strong convection and well-defined outflow to its south. Operationally, it was upgraded to hurricane status six hours earlier.

With a large anticyclone centered near Mazatlán, Sinaloa, Carlotta turned more to the west. Deep convection increased in coverage and intensity as the system maintained impressive upper-level outflow over its southern semicircle.

Hurricane Carlotta maintained peak winds for about twelve hours before weakening as it curved around the periphery of the mid-level ridge over Mexico. Late on June 21, the eye had become less distinct while its surrounding ring of convection eroded and warmed. Early on June 22, northeasterly wind shear increased, and shortly thereafter the weakening trend was temporarily halted with some oscillations in the convective intensity and eye definition. Overall convection continued to diminish, and early on June 25 the winds dropped to tropical depression status. Deep convection ceased to exist by 0600 UTC on June 25, and Carlotta degenerated into a remnant low pressure area. The low-level circulation of Carlotta persisted for several days as it continued northwestward.

Impact

Shortly after first developing, the government of Mexico issued a tropical storm warning from Salina Cruz to Acapulco, and later was extended to Zihuatanejo. Though the National Hurricane Center never forecast it to make landfall, one computer model predicted Carlotta to move ashore; due to the threat, the Mexican government also issued a hurricane watch from Puerto Angel to Zihuatanejo. Outer rainbands and rough surf affected the southwestern coast of Mexico for an extended duration; officials evacuated about 100 families in potentially flooded areas of Acapulco as a precaution. Precipitation and clouds were reported in every Mexican state along the Pacific Ocean, resulting in flooding in some areas. Heavy rainfall and rough seas were also reported on Socorro Island.

Offshore, waves reached  in height. The Lithuanian freighter Linkuva, en route to Long Beach, California, encountered the waves and strong winds as the hurricane was undergoing its period of rapid intensification. A naval vessel from both the United States Navy and the Mexican Navy searched for the freighter for three days, though the crew was lost and presumed killed.

See also

 Other storms of the same name
 List of Category 4 Pacific hurricanes

References

Carlotta
Carlotta 2000
Carlotta 2000
Maritime incidents in 2000
2000 in Mexico
Carlotta